Aloo tikki, also known as aloo ki tikkia, aloo ki tikki or alu tikki, is a snack originating from the Indian subcontinent. In Indian, Pakistani, and Bangladeshi preparation, it is made of boiled potatoes, peas, and various curry spices. Aloo means potato in Hindi-Urdu and Marathi, and tikki means a small cutlet or croquette. The dish is served hot along with a side of saunth, tamarind, and coriander-mint sauce, and sometimes dahi (yogurt) or chickpeas.

The snack is vegetarian and is an Indian equivalent of the hash brown.

Variations
Due to the broad geographical distribution of Indian people throughout the world, a number of variations on this dish exist.

In Mumbai, a popular version of aloo tikki is served with a spicy curry and various chutneys. It is called Ragda pattice and is sold at various chaat stalls throughout the city and especially on Chowpatti Beach. The aloo tikki in this region is made of mainly locally grown spices such as turmeric, whereas in Bangalore, more coriander is used.

In the United Kingdom, vegetable tikki is available from delicatessen counters at various shops.

Some North Indian dhabas or café-style eateries will sandwich the aloo in bread.

References

Potato dishes
Indian snack foods
Indian fast food
Pakistani cuisine
Pakistani snack foods
Pakistani fast food
Uttar Pradeshi cuisine
Hindi words and phrases